Sonia Touati (born 13 March 1973) is a Tunisian table tennis player. She competed at the 1992 Summer Olympics and the 1996 Summer Olympics.

References

1973 births
Living people
Tunisian female table tennis players
Olympic table tennis players of Tunisia
Table tennis players at the 1992 Summer Olympics
Table tennis players at the 1996 Summer Olympics
Place of birth missing (living people)
20th-century Tunisian women